Luis Estrada Rodríguez (born January 17, 1962) is a Mexican film director, producer, and screenwriter. He is known for his films that openly criticize the Mexican political system and the controversial issues that revolve around it. He has been nominated for 10 Ariel Awards winning four of them, including two Best Director awards for Herod's Law (1999) and El Infierno (2010).

Filmography

Film

Television

External links 
 
LUIS ESTRADA - SensaCine
Biografia - UNAM

1962 births
Ariel Award winners
Best Director Ariel Award winners
Film directors from Mexico City
Living people
Mexican filmmakers
Mexican film producers
Mexican screenwriters
Writers from Mexico City